Košarkaški klub Dynamic BG, commonly referred to as KK Dynamic or Dynamic Balkan Bet due to sponsorship reasons, is a men's professional basketball club based in Belgrade, Serbia. They are currently competing in the top-tier Basketball League of Serbia.

History
Dynamic was founded in March 2015 in Belgrade. One of the founders was a basketball coach Miroslav Nikolić.

In its debut season in the Second League of Serbia KK Dynamic won the League and got promoted to the Basketball League of Serbia for the 2016–17 season.

Sponsorship naming
The club has had several denominations through the years due to its sponsorship:
 Dynamic VIP PAY (2018–2022)
 Dynamic Balkan Bet (2022–present)

Home arenas

 Dynamic Sports Center (2015–present)
 Ranko Žeravica Hall (2017–present)

Logos

Players

Current roster

Coaches

 Bojan Kusmuk (14 March 2015 – 14 February 2016)
 Miroslav Nikolić (14 February 2016 – 28 June 2017)
 Oliver Popović (7 August 2017 – 19 December 2017)
 Miroslav Nikolić (19 December 2017 – 4 July 2018 )
 Vladimir Đokić (4 July 2018 – 10 April 2019)
 Miro Alilović (10 April 2019 – 12 February 2021)
 Saša Nikitović (12 February 2021 – present)

Season-by-season

Trophies and awards

Trophies
Serbian League B
Winners (1): 2015–16

BFS Cup
Winners (1): 2016–17

Individual awards 
 BLS First League MVP Award
  Kimani Ffriend — 2016–17
 BLS Super League MVP Award
  Marko Čakarević — 2016–17

Management 
President: 
Vice-President: Goran Milić
Technical secretary: Aleksandar Smiljanić
Public relations manager: 
Sports director: Mirko Pavlović 
Head coach:

Notable players
 Stevan Nađfeji
 Bojan Krstović
 Marko Čakarević
 Kimani Ffriend
 Aleksandar Lazić
 Ratko Varda
 Aleksandar Ćapin
 Gregor Glas
 Peter Sedmak

References

External links
Profile at eurobasket.com

 
Basketball teams in Belgrade
Basketball teams established in 2015